Angioletta Coradini (1 July 1946 – 4 September 2011) was an Italian astrophysicist and planetary scientist.

Biography
In 1970 she completed a master's degree in physics at the University of Rome, the city where she would do her research over her entire career—at first at the university, then from 1975 at the National Research Council of Italy (CNR), and finally at the National Astrophysics Institute of Italy (INAF).

Participation in international scientific projects
 Co-investigator for NASA lunar and planetary research (1970–74);
 Member of the Science Team for the CIRS and VIMS instruments, and PI of the VIMS visible channel, Cassini-Huygens mission (1991–2011)
 Coordinator of the Moon Orbiting Observatory (MORO) proposal and member of the MORO science team (1993–96);
 Member of the Observing Time Allocation Committee (OTAC) for the ESA Infrared Observatory (ISO) mission (1994–96);
 Member of the  European Southern Observatory (ESO) observing Program Committee, Panel F (1997–99);
 Member of the Scientific Council of the Finnish Academy of Space Studies “Antares” (1999–2004);
 Member of the Scientific Council of the International Institute of Space Studies (ISSI), headquartered in Bern (1999–2002);
 Member of the High Scientific Committee of the Paris Observatory;
 PI of the Jiram Instrument for the NASA New Frontiers Juno mission (2005–11);
 Member of the Space Advisory Group (SAG) of the European Community (2008–11);

Awards and recognition
 David Bates Medal (2007) “In recognition of her important and wide ranging work in planetary sciences and Solar System formation, and her leading role in the development of space infrared instrumentation for planetary exploration”;
 Jean Dominique Cassini Medal & Honorary Membership 2012;
 2012 NASA Distinguished Public Service Medal;
 Angioletta crater on Vesta (name approved in 2014);
 Coradini crater on Pluto (name approved in 2022).

Projects
The Jovian Infrared Auroral Mapper instrument project for the Juno orbiter for Jupiter was started by Professor Angioletta Coradini.

Death
Coradini died in 2011 from cancer.

References

1946 births
2011 deaths
20th-century Italian geologists
20th-century Italian physicists
20th-century Italian women scientists
Deaths from cancer in Lazio
Italian astrophysicists
Italian geophysicists
Italian women geologists
Italian women physicists
Women planetary scientists
Planetary scientists
21st-century Italian geologists
21st-century Italian physicists
21st-century Italian women scientists
National Research Council (Italy) people